Monkey Business may refer to:

Film and television
 Monkey Business (1925 film), a Krazy Kat cartoon
 Monkey Business (1926 film), an Our Gang comedy
 Monkey Business (1931 film), a Marx Brothers comedy
 Monkey Business (1952 film), directed by Howard Hawks with Cary Grant
 Monkey Business (2022 film), directed by Daniel Guzmán
 Monkey Business (TV series), a British documentary series
 "Monkey Business", an episode of Californication

Music 
 Monkey Business (band), a Czech funk band
 Monkey Business (Black Eyed Peas album), 2005
 Monkey Business (Margaret album), 2017
 "Monkey Business" (Skid Row song), 1991
 "Monkey Business" (Michael Jackson song), released 2004
 "Monkey Business", a song by Nik Kershaw on the album Human Racing
 "Monkey Business", a song by Pain on the album Cynic Paradise
 "Monkey Business", a song by Danger Danger on the album Screw It!
 "Monkey Business", a song by Pet Shop Boys on the album Hotspot

Other
 Monkey Business (yacht), a part of the 1987 Gary Hart US political scandal
 "Monkey Business" (short story), by P. G. Wodehouse
 Monkey Business, a 1987 children's book by Mark Burgess
 Mischief
 (monkey) Business, an early name for the DotA 2 eSports team OG

See also
 "Monkey Bizness", a recurring comic strip in The Dandy magazine
 "Too Much Monkey Business", a 1956 song by Chuck Berry, covered by several artists